The Double Concerto is a composition for violin, cello, and orchestra by the American composer Ned Rorem.  The work was commissioned by the Indianapolis Symphony Orchestra and composed between July 27, 1997 and April 1998.  It was composed for the violinist Jaime Laredo and the cellist Sharon Robinson, who first performed the piece with the Indianapolis Symphony Orchestra conducted by Raymond Leppard in Indianapolis on October 15, 1998.

Composition

Background
Rorem had known and worked with the cellist Sharon Robinson and the violinist Jaime Laredo for many years.  In 1980, Rorem had composed his suite After Reading Shakespeare specifically for Sharon Robinson.  Likewise, he had composed his 1984 Violin Concerto for Jaime Laredo.  Thus, when Rorem received a commission from the Indianapolis Symphony Orchestra, he used the opportunity to write a double concerto for the two soloists.  Rorem described his intent for the piece in the score program notes, writing:

Structure
The work has a duration of roughly 35 minutes and is cast in eight movements:
Morning
Adam and Eve
Mazurka
Staying on Alone
Their Accord
Looking
Conversation at Midnight
Flight

Instrumentation
The work is scored for solo violin and cello and a small orchestra comprising two flutes, two oboes, two clarinets, two bassoons, two horns, two trumpets, and strings.  In the score program notes, Rorem commented on the meek instrumentation, remarking, "The scoring is plain: only eight winds, four brass, and strings. No glamorous harps, keyboards, or mallets, and no percussion, none. (In growing older I've come to feel that percussion is, at best, mere decoration, at worst, immoral, like too many earrings or too many exclamation points!!)"

Reception
Reviewing a recording of the work, Peter Dickinson of Gramophone wrote:

Recording
A recording of the work, performed by Laredo, Robinson, and the IRIS Orchestra under the direction of Michael Stern, was released through Naxos Records in December 2006.

See also
List of double concertos for violin and cello

References

Concertos by Ned Rorem
1998 compositions
Rorem
Music commissioned by the Indianapolis Symphony Orchestra